William Felton may refer to:
William Felton (died 1367), seneschal of Poitou, killed in a skirmish in Spain while fighting for the Black Prince
William Felton (coachmaker), 18th century London coachmaker, 36 Leather Lane, Holborn
William Harrell Felton (1823–1909), American politician
William Felton (composer)
Billy Felton (1900–1977), English footballer
William Bowman Felton (1782–1837), British naval officer and political figure
William Locker Pickmore Felton (1812–1877), Canadian lawyer and politician

See also
William Felton Russell